The  is a professional wrestling openweight championship and the top singles accomplishment in the Japanese promotion CyberFight currently defended in the DDT Pro-Wrestling (DDT) brand division. It is one of CyberFight's top major world titles, alongside the GHC Heavyweight Championship in Pro Wrestling Noah. The title was established in 2000 and the inaugural champion was Masao Orihara.

History

Dramatic Dream Team (now DDT Pro-Wrestling) was founded in 1997. In 2000, DDT commissioner Exciting Yoshida created the promotion's first championship, briefly called DDT Openweight Championship, before the King of DDT (KO-D) was established as DDT's governing body and the title was officially named KO-D Openweight Championship.

The inaugural championship match was scheduled for a live event held at the Kitazawa Town Hall, on April 19. At the event, Masao Orihara defeated DDT founder Sanshiro Takagi in the final bout to become the inaugural champion.

On November 22, 2001, Nosawa was stripped of the title by Exciting Yoshida for "not being appropriate as a champion", which led to the first vacancy of the title.

In December 2005, DDT announced a new belt would be unveiled to replace the worn out original design. The new belt was put up for grab on December 28, at Never Mind, in a five-way ladder match in which Danshoku Dino defended the title against Sanshiro Takagi, Super Uchuu Power, Franceso Togo and Toru Owashi. Dino won the match and the new belt.

On December 22, 2010, the title was vacated for the second time when champion Dick Togo suffered an injury. Antonio Honda was scheduled to have a championship match against Togo at Never Mind, on December 26; he instead faced Gentaro to determine an interim champion. Honda defeated Gentaro and served as interim champion until the January 30 event Sweet Dreams!, where Togo faced Honda in a unification match, which Togo won.

On June 12, 2022, at CyberFight Festival 2022, champion Tetsuya Endo suffered a legitimate concussion when he was struck by Katsuhiko Nakajima. Two days later, DDT held a press conference ahead of the 2022 edition of the King of DDT tournament scheduled to start on June 16. It was announced that due to the injury, Endo would relinquish the title and forfeit his first round match, while the tournament would crown a new champion. On July 3, 2022, Kazusada Higuchi defeated Naomi Yoshimura in the final and consequently won the vacant title.

Belt design

The first KO-D Openweight Championship belt had five plates on a black leather strap. The rounded center plate featured a globe centered on the Greenwich meridian. Three banners above the globe read, from top to bottom, "Professional Wrestling", "D²T" and "Dramatic Dream Team". The lower banner at the bottom of the globe read "Wrestling Champion". Each side plate featured the name and flag of a country with a rich tradition in professional wrestling. From left to right, those countries were Mexico, the United States, Japan and Canada. This inexpensive belt deteriorated quickly and a new belt was introduced in December 2005.

The second belt had a central plate that featured a globe centered on the International Date Line with the second "D²T" logo on top in red enamel. The banner above the globe read "Professional Wrestling" and above the banner were two wrestlers grappling. The two banners below the globe read "Dramatic Dream Team" and "KOD Open-Weight Champion". The belt had four side plates similar to the previous version but with Canada and Mexico having swapped places. This belt was retired on March 27, 2022, at Day Dream Believer where a third belt was unveiled and given to then champion Tetsuya Endo.

The third and current belt has a central plate that features the current DDT logo. A banner above the logo reads "Dramatic-Dream Team". The words "KO-D Open-Weight Champion" are written along the bottom edge of the central plate. The two inner side plates both feature a globe; the one on the left plate is centered on America, while the one on the right is centered on Japan. The two outer side plates both feature the DDT logo. All plates have red gems in their corners and the central plate also has white gems along its vertical edges.

Reigns

Masao Orihara was the inaugural champion. Harashima, who holds the record for most reigns with 10, most combined defences with 27 and most combined days as champion at 1,314.. Konosuke Takeshita's second reign is the longest at 405 days, while Daisuke Sasaki, Ken Ohka and Sanshiro Takagi reigns are the shortest at less than a day. Jun Akiyama is the oldest champion when he won it at 51 years old, while Konosuke Takeshita is the youngest champion at 21 years old.

The current title holder is Yuji Hino who is in his second reign. He defeated Kazusada Higuchi at Sweet Dreams! 2023 on January 29, 2023, in Tokyo, Japan.

Combined reigns

See also

Professional wrestling in Japan

References

External links
 KO-D Openweight Championship on Wrestling-Titles.com
  (in Japanese)

DDT Pro-Wrestling championships
Openweight wrestling championships